The Paenitentiale Theodori (also known as the Iudicia Theodori or Canones Theodori) is an early medieval penitential handbook based on the judgements of Archbishop Theodore of Canterbury. It exists in multiple versions, the fullest and historically most important of which is the U or Discipulus Umbrensium version (hereafter the Paenitentiale Umbrense), composed (probably) in Northumbria within approximately a decade or two after Theodore's death. Other early though far less popular versions are those known today as the Capitula Dacheriana, the Canones Gregorii, the Canones Basilienses, and the Canones Cottoniani, all of which were compiled before the Paenitentiale Umbrense probably in either Ireland and/or England during or shortly after Theodore's lifetime.

Background
It is generally accepted by scholars today that Theodore himself is not responsible for any of the penitential works ascribed to him. Rather, a certain associate of Theodore's named Eoda is generally regarded as the point of dissemination of certain judgements proffered by Theodore in an unofficial context and in response to questions put to him by students at his Canterbury school regarding proper ecclesiastical organization and discipline.

Authorship and structure

Capitula Dacheriana
Scholars have for some time accepted that the Capitula Dacheriana represents the earliest attempt to assemble together Theodorian penitential judgments. The case for the Capitula Dacheriana as an Irish production has been argued most effectively by Thomas Charles-Edwards, who noticed, first, that the Capitula Dacheriana lacks any obvious structural framework. For Charles-Edwards, this feature (or rather lack of a feature) is symptomatic of the non-Roman character of the Capitula Dacheriana, and thus suggests its creation outside of Theodore's immediate circle, and perhaps even outside of the Rome-oriented Anglo-Saxon church. Whether or not this is true, there are other, strong signs that the Capitula Dacheriana was produced in ecclesiastical circles that had rather less connection to Theodore's Canterbury than with Irish and Celtic centres. Specifically, the Capitula Dacheriana has both textual and literary connections with eighth-century Irish and/or Breton canonical activities.

The Capitula Dacheriana is witnessed today by two tenth-century manuscripts produced in Brittany. Ludwig Bieler has shown that the copyists of both manuscripts derived their text of the Capitula Dacheriana from the same eighth-century collection of Irish materials that was still resident in Brittany in the tenth century — a collection that also included (or was at least closely associated with) the Collectio canonum Hibernensis. The A-recension of the Collectio canonum Hibernensis, believed to have been compiled before 725, is the earliest work known to have drawn on the Paenitentiale Theodori tradition, relying on none other than the Capitula Dacheriana version. From this it appears that the Capitula Dacheriana was assembled perhaps as early as a decade after Theodore's death (in 690), and certainly no later than the first quarter of the eighth century. It was very possibly compiled in Ireland (though possibly instead in an Anglo-Irish or Breton milieux), and was used shortly after its creation as a source for the Collectio canonum Hibernensis, which would itself (even very soon after its creation) go on to influence powerfully the developing canon law and penitential traditions in Francia.

Canones Gregorii

Canones Basilienses

Canones Cottoniani

Paenitentiale Umbrense
The Paenitentiale Umbrense is a selection of canons from the earlier Capitula Dacheriana, Canones Gregorii, Canones Cottoniani and Canones Basilienses, along with additional Theodorian judgments that were obtained by a mysterious figure named Eoda Christianus. As we learn in the preface to the Paenitentiale Umbrense, these latter judgments were proffered by the Archbishop in answer to questions raised by rulings found in a certain "Irish document" (libellus Scottorum), a work that is commonly believed to be the Paenitentiale Cummeani. All of this material has been arranged by the author of the Paenitentiale Umbrense according to topic, with occasional commentary and additional rulings added in by the author of the Paenitentiale Umbrense himself. The Paenitentiale Umbrense is thus far more organized than its predecessors, and — owing to its contents derived from Eoda and the libellus Scottorum — also includes more content that is strictly "penitential" in nature.

The identity of the author is controversial. In the prologue (or rather dedicatory letter) to the Paenitentiale Umbrense the author identifies himself as a discipulus Umbrensium, "a student of the [North]umbrians". Whether this identifies the authors nationality, or merely his academic affiliation, is unclear, and several interpretations of its meaning have been advanced. Felix Liebermann believed that the discipulus was an Irish disciple of Theodore, while Paul Finsterwalder argued that the discipulus was a man, Irish-born though trained in Anglo-Saxon schools, who worked on the Continent, probably within the context of Willibrord's Continental mission. A year after they were published Finsterwalder's conclusions were roundly rejected by Wilhelm Levison, who argued that the Paenitentiale Umbrense was the work of an Anglo-Saxon working in England. Scholars since have generally sided with Levison in viewing the Paenitentiale Umbrense as the product of Anglo-Saxon England, and more specifically of a student working in Northumbria.

The Paenitentiale Umbrense survives in two forms: a Full Form and a Half Form. The Full Form is clearly the more original work, the Half Form being simply the last fourteen topics or chapters or the Full Form. The Full Form itself survives in slightly different versions. In the earliest of these the work is divided into twenty-nine chapters (though the Fulda Recension [discussed below] divides the work slightly differently and into twenty-eight chapters). These are:

1: On drunkenness
2: On fornication
3: On theft (avaritia furtiva)
4: On manslaughter
5: On heretics (lit. "those deceived by heresy")
6: On perjury
7: On diverse evils, and on actions that are not culpable because necessary or accidental (quae non nocent necessari)
8: On the ways in which clerics can do wrong
9: On those who should be laicized, and those who cannot be ordained
10: On the twice-baptized and how they may do penance
11: On those who do not honor the Lord's day and hold ecclesiastical fasts in contempt
12: On Eucharistic communion and the sacrifice
13: On the public reconciliation of penitents
14: On penance specific to those in Christian marriage
15: On the worship of idols and demons
16: On church administration and church-building
17: On the three principal ecclesiastical grades (i.e. bishops, priests and deacons)
18: On ordinations (of bishops, priests, deacons, monks, abbots, abbesses, nuns, virgins, widows, etc.)
19: On baptism and confirmation
20: On the mass for the dead
21: On abbots, monks and the monastery
22: On rites performable by women, and on their ministry in the church
23: On different customs among Greeks and Romans
24: On the communion of the Irish and British, who do not keep Easter or the tonsure according to Catholic custom
25: On the mentally ill (lit. "those troubled by a devil")
26: On the use and avoidance of animals for food
27: On questions pertaining to marriage
28: On servants
29: On diverse questions

A later version of the Full Form has these twenty-nine chapters divided into two books, with chapters 1–15 comprising the first book and chapters 16–29 (renumbered as cc. 1–14) comprising the second. Up until recently, scholars had assumed that the two-book version of the Full Form was the original version of the Paenitentiale Umbrense. Accordingly all previous editors (Wasserschleben, Haddan–Stubbs and Finsterwalder) have printed the two-book version, and all previous scholarship has been predicated on the assumption that the author of the Paenitentiale Umbrense created a work divided into two books. Several scholars even claim to have detected a generic division between the two books, noting that many of the subjects covered in the first book (drunkenness, fornication, pagan practices, etc.) are those typically associated with the penitential genre, while many of the subjects in the second book (church administration, ordination, baptism) are those typically dealt with in canon law collections. It has been supposed that this is because the author of the Paenitentiale Umbrense wished to divide the chapters of his source material (i.e. the Capitula Dacheriana and the Canones Greogrii) into those of a penitential nature (= Book I) and those of a canonical nature (= Book II). However, it now seems more likely that the more noticeably penitential nature of the first fifteen chapters is due not to the author's specific desire to front-load his work with exclusively penitential material, but rather to his decision to incorporate into pre-existing collections of Theodorian canons (= the Capitula Dacheriana and the Canones Greogrii) the newly acquired canons obtained from Eoda. As described above, the material that the discipulus had managed to obtain (probably indirectly) from Eoda was based largely on Theodore's responses to rulings found in the Paenitentiale Cummeani. All such material from the Paenitentiale Cummeani is indeed found in chapters 2–14 (~ Book I) of the Paenitentiale Umbrense. The highly "penitential" nature of chapters 2–14 is therefore merely an accident of the discipulus’s decision to treat first those subjects touched on by his Eoda/Paenitentiale Cummeani material, namely the traditionally "penitential" subjects of fornication, theft, manslaughter and marriage. Beyond this there was apparently no attempt on the part of the discipulus to treat "penitential" subjects in the first fifteen chapters and "canonical" ones in the last fourteen. Indeed, the last fifteen chapters (= Book II) treats several subjects aligned strongly with the "penitential" genre, for example food avoidance, marital relations and mental illness, while Book I contains chapters dealing with subjects more commonly associated with canon law collections, namely baptism, heresy, and ordination. Neither do the sources used by the author of the Paenitentiale Umbrense give any indication of a generic division between its first and second halves, for a great many canonical sources (i.e. papal decretals and ancient eastern conciliar canons) are drawn upon in the first half.

It now seems that in its original form the Paenitentiale Umbrense was a twenty-nine chapter work and that the two-book version was a later development. The earliest manuscripts — which also happen to transmit the oldest textual variants — witness to a work divided into twenty-nine chapters, while it is only two later manuscripts — which also contain patently more recent textual variants — in which the Paenitentiale Umbrense appears as a work divided into two books. It is also now clear that the passage from the prologue commonly used to defend to idea that the work was originally divided into two works has been misinterpreted. The prologue runs as follows, with the relevant portion in bold:
A student in Northumbria, humbly, to all catholics in England, particularly to the doctors of souls: salutary redemption in Christ the lord. First of all, I have, dear [brothers], held it a worthy enough thing to lay bare to your Love’s blessedness whence I have gathered the poultices of this medicine which follows, lest (as often happens) through copyists’ decrepitude or carelessness that law [lex] should be left hideously confused which God once, in a figurative way, handed down through his first legislator and ultimately to the Fathers [de secundo patribus] in order that they might make it known to their sons, so that the following generation might learn [of it], namely penance, which the lord Jesus, after being baptized, proclaimed to us, having [as yet] no medicine, as above all the substance [prae omnibus ... instrumentum] of his teaching, saying, 'Do you all penance', etc.; who for the increase of your felicity deigned to guide — from the blessed seat of him [eius, i.e. Peter] to whom it is said 'Whichever things you set free upon the land will be set free also in the heavens' — him [eum, i.e. Theodore] by whom this most helpful salve for wounds would be concocted [temperetur]. 'For I', the apostle says, 'have received from the lord'; and I say, dear [brothers]: with the lord's favour I have received from you even that which I have given to you. Accordingly, the greater part of these [remedies] Eoda the priest, of blessed memory, known to some as 'Christianus', is said (by trustworthy report) to have received under instruction from the venerable master [antestite] Theodore. And these are buttressed [In istorum quoque adminiculum est] by what divine grace likewise delivered to our unworthy hands, [namely] things which the aforementioned man came to learn from a widely known Irish booklet, concerning which the elder [senex] is said to have given this opinion: [that] an ecclesiastic [ecclesiasticus homo] was the author of that book. Many others also, not only men but also women, enkindled by him with an inextinguishable passion for these [remedies], in order to slake their thirst hurried with burning desire to crowd round a person of undoubtedly singular knowledge in our age. Whence there has been found among diverse persons that diverse and confused digest of those rules, composed together with established causes of the second book [Unde et illa diversa confusaque degestio regularum illarum constitutis causis libri secundi conscripta inventa est apud diversos]. On account of which, brothers, through him who was crucified and who by the shedding of his blood confirmed what mighty things he had preached while living, I beg your Love's [pacis] most obliging kindness that, if I have herein perpetrated any misdeed of rashness or negligence, in consideration of the utility of this [work] you defend me before him with the merit of your intercessory prayer. I call upon as witness him, the maker of all things, that in so far as I know myself these things [I] have done for the sake of the kingdom about which he preached. And, as I truly fear, if I do something beyond my talents, yet may the good intentions [benevolentia] of so necessary a work [as this] seek from him pardon for my crimes, with you as [my] advocates — for all of whom equally and without jealousy I labor, insofar as I am able. And from all of those things I have been able to select [invenire] the more useful [topics] and compile them together, placing titles before each. For I trust that these things will draw the attention of those of good soul [bono animo], concerning whom it is said ‘Peace upon the land to people of good will'.
The context makes it obvious that the libri secundi highlighted in bold above refers to nothing other than the Scottorum libellus mentioned several times previously. There is thus no need to suppose, and no evidence to support, that the discipulus composed his work in two books.

The two-book version most likely arose under the influence of the canon law collection known as the Collectio canonum vetus Gallica. As mentioned above, the Paenitentiale Umbrense survives in a Full Form, and in a Half Form. So far as can be determined, the Half Form first arose in Corbie between 725 and 750, when the Vetus Gallica collection was undergoing revision and expansion. Those responsible for revising the Vetus Gallica had not long before acquired a copy of the Paenitentiale Umbrense, which they decided to include in their revised collection. For whatever reason, the Corbie revisers were interested only in the final fourteen canons of the Paenitentiale Umbrense, and it was these canons alone that they included in the appendix to the Corbie redaction of the Vetus Gallica. Thus began the tradition of the Half Form version of the Paenitentiale Umbrense. The Corbie redaction of the Vetus Gallica was very successful and very soon after its creation it was enjoying wide circulation in France, Germany, Bavaria and northern Italy. As a result, far more copies of the Half Form version of the Paenitentiale Umbrense were read and copied — either as part of the Vetus Gallica appendix or as part of derivative canon law collections — than ever were of the stand-alone or Full Form version. The two-book version of the Full Form probably only developed after the Half Form had achieved popularity, that is in the second half of the eighth century or first half of the ninth. Since by then most who knew the Paenitentiale Umbrense knew it only in its Half Form version, someone who happened upon the Full Form (which still circulated, though much less widely than the Half) would likely come to believe that that had found a fuller version of the Paenitentiale Umbrense. And of course they would be right. However, so used would they be to viewing the last fourteen chapters as a discrete unit that they would insist on dividing the newly (re)discovered Full Form into two books, with the first fifteen chapters comprising a welcome new (or seemingly new) addition to the Theodorian corpus, and the last fourteen chapters comprising the already familiar Half Form. They would perhaps also have been helped along in their decision to introduce such division by the mention of a libri secuundi in the newly (re)discovered prologue. Future copies of the now-divided Full Form would preserve the two-book format. Centuries later, similar assumptions would be made by nineteenth- and twentieth-century editors, who come to accept as original the two-book format over the twenty-nine chapter format. In 1851 Hermann Wasserschleben would be convinced by the large number of manuscripts containing the Half Form of the Paenitentiale Umbrense, as well as by a single seventeenth century apograph of MS Cb4 exhibiting the two-book format, that the work must have originally been composed with two distinct parts; he was therefore persuaded to ignore the evidence of his two earliest manuscripts (W7 and W9) and print the Paenitentiale Umbrense with a two-book format. Subsequent editors would base their editions both on the two-book text as established by Wasserschleben and on those manuscripts that were closest or that seemed most ancient to them: these were (for Finsterwalder) MS V5 and (for Haddan–Stubbs) MS Cb4, both of which happen to present the Paenitentiale Umbrense in two books. The textual tradition of the Paenitentiale Umbrense has not been studied closely since the work of Finsterwalder, and so the evidence (or rather the lack thereof) for their assumptions about priority of the two-book format have gone unexamined.

Some copies of the Full Form contain a prologue, while others lack the prologue but contain an epilogue instead. No extant copy contains both the prologue and epilogue, a fact that led Finsterwalder to conclude that the epilogue was not original, but was only a later addition intended to replace the prologue. Wilhelm Levison countered this argument by demonstrating that the prologue and epilogue share remarkably similar style, and therefore must have been composed by the same individual. He also pointed out that the prologue is clearly an original part of the Paenitentiale Umbrense because c. 7.5 of the text refers to it directly; and there is also an oblique yet obvious reference to the prologue in the first sentence of the epilogue. The presence of the prologue and epilogue in some witnesses and not in others can be explained without resorting to hypotheses about different authorship or about the priority of one and the posteriority of the other. Of the six witnesses to the Full Form (Cb4, V5, V6, W7, W9, Wz2), all have the prologue except W9 and V6. V6 is fragmentary and preserves no part of the Paenitentiale Umbrense except the epilogue from eruditis illa onwards, while W9 (as Levison suggested) probably once contained the prologue on a folio (now lost) between fols 1v and 2r (i.e. between the capitulatio and beginning of the text) and this folio has since been cut away. (The copies of the prologue in Cb4 and Wz2 are incomplete: Cb4 due to the loss of a folio, Wz2 due to abbreviation.) W9 and V6 are also the only two witnesses to contain the epilogue; yet, in each of the other four witnesses the absence of the epilogue can be explained. Both Wz2 and V5 are fragmentary at their ends, and so may have once contained the epilogue (it is impossible now to be sure either way); while both Cb4 and W7 have (as Levison pointed out) simply replaced the prologue with copies of the Libellus responsionum so as to make the latter seem like part of the former. It has recently been argued by Michael Glatthaar that because the epilogue refers disparagingly to certain heretical beliefs associated with two of Boniface's most hated opponents — Adalbert and Clemens — it is most likely a later addition by Boniface or someone in his circle. While the very strong arguments put forward by Levison for the originality of the epilogue render Glatthaar's view of the entire epilogue as a Bonifatian document rather unconvincing, there is no reason that Glatthaar's argument could not apply specifically to those parts of the epilogue that discuss the heretical beliefs of Adalbert and Clemens; such discussions are confined entirely to the second half of the epilogue, which in fact reads more like an epistolary dedication than an epilogue, and so may very well be a Bonifatian addition.

Manuscripts and transmission
There are numerous extant manuscripts that contain the Paenitentiale Theodori or parts thereof. The following tables divide the extant witnesses into Umbrense versions, non-Umbrense versions, and excerpts. Umbrense versions are further divided into Full Form and Half Form. The sigla given below are based on those established by the Körntgen–Kottje Editionsprojekt for the Corpus Christianorum, Series Latina, vol. 156, a project whose goal is to produce scholarly editions for all major early medieval penitentials; sigla in parentheses are those used by Paul W. Finsterwalder in his 1929 edition.

Umbrense versions

Full Form

Twenty-Nine Chapter Version

Two-Book Version

Half Form

Non-Umbrense versions

Excerpts
Note that reports of the presence of Paenitentiale Umbrense and/or Canones Gregorii excerpts in the tenth-century Collectio 77 capitulorum as found in Heiligenkreuz, Stiftsbibliothek, MS 217 and Munich, Bayerische Staatsbibliothek, Clm 3853 are in error. What such reports are actually referring to is the penitential known as the Capitula iudiciorum (previously known as the Poenitentiale XXXV capitulorum).

The following table summarizes the manuscript distribution of the several versions of the Paenitentiale Theodori (not including small excerpts):

Summary of manuscript distribution

Finsterwalder further divided the witnesses of the Paenitentiale Umbrense into two classes ...

Of the earliest manuscript witnesses, namely those dating to the end of the eighth or beginning of the ninth centuries, none originate in England, the supposed place of origin of the Paenitentiale Theodori; this is not unusual, however, since many early Insular texts survive today exclusively in Continental witnesses. The majority of extant manuscripts of the Paenitentiale Theodori originate in either Burgundy, northeastern France, and the region of the Rhine and Main rivers. This is significant, as it is these areas in which the Anglo-Saxon mission, specifically that part directed by Boniface, operated in during the first half of the eighth century. The manuscript evidence may thus reflect an early transmission within the scribal centres in the area of this mission, and so may indicate Anglo-Saxon involvement in the Paententiale Theodoris early dissemination throughout and/or its introduction to the Continent.

Reception
As discussed above (Authorship), the Capitula Dacheriana was perhaps the earliest of the several versions. Based on the close connection between the Capitula Dacheriana and the Collectio Hibernensis, Charles-Edwards has argued that the Capitula Dacheriana were produced, perhaps in conjunction with the Hibernensis, in Ireland, whence the text was imported along with the Hibernensis to Brittany and subsequently Francia.

The most likely candidate for the introduction of the Paenitentiale Umbrense to the Continent is Boniface, an Anglo-Saxon missionary and a competent canonist who work tirelessly to reform the Frankish, German and Bavarian churches in the first half of the eighth century. Boniface knew the Paenitentiale Umbrense, for quotations of it pepper several canonical works that are attributed to him. Boniface also knew, and worked closely with, the papal document known as the Libellus responsionum. It is no surprise, then, that the earliest manuscript witnesses of the Paenitentiale Umbrense transmit this text in close proximity with the Libellus responsionum. It was also probably Boniface who was responsible for introducing the Paenitentiale Umbrense to the Corbie redaction of the Collectio canonum vetus Gallica, in whose creation he seems to have played some part.

The Canones Gregorii is quoted twice in c. 19 of Pirmin's Scarapsus, and on this basis Eckhard Hauswald, the most recent editor of the Scarapsus, was able to date this text to between 725 and 750  The Paenitentiale Umbrense was also used as a source for two early eighth-century Continental penitentials, namely the Excarpsus Cummeani and the Capitula iudiciorum. And several chapters from the Half Form were added to the text of the Corbie redaction of the Collectio canonum vetus Gallica, produced in the second quarter of the eighth century — this in addition to the inclusion of nearly the entire latter half (= Book II or Half Form) of the Paenitentiale Umbrense in the Vetus Gallica appendix. Altogether, these four works demonstrate that the Paenitentiale Umbrense was available for use on the Continent well before the year 750. The Collectio Sangermanensis, dating to the second half of the eighth century and probably also produced at Corbie, also draws on the Paenitentiale Umbrense ...

Towards the end of the eighth century, Paul the deacon, in his Historia Langobardorum c. 5.30, testified to Theodore's reputation as a promulgator of penitential canons.

It is perhaps significant that four of the five Collectio canonum vetus Gallica witnesses that contain an appended copy of the Half Form of the Paenitentiale Umbrense — Br7, K1, P10, St2 — are those from Mordek's 'North French' class. Moreover, Br7, K1, P10, St2 are the only copies of the Collectio canonum vetus Gallica to contain a series of chapters drawn from the monastic rules of Columban, Macarius, Basil and Benedict (Collectio canonum vetus Gallica cc. 46.26–37). These are the only chapters in the entire Collectio canonum vetus Gallica tradition to draw on monastic sources. The fifth Collectio canonum vetus Gallica witness that contains a copy of the Half Form of the Paenitentiale Umbrense — St3 — is from Mordek's 'South German' class, a class that represents a tradition about as old as the 'North French' one (i.e. the 740's; both traditions stem ultimately from a mid-eighth-century Corbie redaction). However, whereas the manuscripts of the 'North French' tradition preserve more or less intact the series of mainly penitential texts appended to the Collectio canonum vetus Gallica (Synodus II Patricii, Paenitentiale Umbrense, etc.), most of the manuscripts of the 'South German' class have modified greatly the arrangement and constituent texts of this appended series. The 'South German' manuscript St3 is exceptional, however. As Mordek has shown, it is not only the most faithful witness to the 'South German' Vetus Gallica tradition, it is also the witness with an appendix most resembling that of the 'North French' tradition. It is, for example, the only manuscript from outside the 'North French' group to contain in its appendix the Synodus II Patricii, the Isidorian Epistula ad Massonam, the canons of the council of Rome in 595 (Pope Gregory I's Libellus synodicus), and the Paenitentiale Umbrense. What might therefore have seemed like an anomaly in the tradition of the Paenitentiale Umbrense + Collectio canonum vetus Gallica combination — namely that an apparently distinctive feature of the 'North French' tradition (the presence of the Paenitentiale Umbrense in the appendix) is also shared by a single 'South German' manuscript — in fact is only evidence that the Paenitentiale Umbrense was part of the original series of texts appended to the Corbie redaction of the Collectio canonum vetus Gallica in the mid-eighth century.

According to Mordek, fols 80–195 of P6 (which contain the Collectio canonum Sancti Amandi, the Libellus responsionum, Pope Gregory II's letter for Boniface beginning Desiderabilem mihi, the Half Form of the Paenitentiale Umbrense, the canons of the council of Rome in 721, and the canons of the council of Rome in 595) are likely a copy — modified with the help of a Collectio Hispana of either the Gallican or Pseudo-Isidorian form — of fols 128–266 of P26.

Although P39 is above classified as a Collectio canonum Sancti Amandi witness, and although it exhibits the same Paenitentiale Umbrense omissions that are characteristic of all Sancti Amandi witnesses (namely omission of 16.1–3 and 25.5–26.9), there are nevertheless reasons not to associate the P39 copy of the Paenitentiale Umbrense with the Sancti Amandi tradition. First, it has long been recognized that the contents of P39 are very similar to those of Berlin, Staatsbibliothek Preußischer Kulturbesitz, Phill. 1741, copied in the same place and time as P39 (ca 850×875 in Reims). However, the section of P39 that contains the Paenitentiale Umbrense (fols 151–166 = Böhringer's "Teil II") is not duplicated in Phill. 1741. What is more, this section of P39, which is self-contained on two gatherings (gatherings 21–22), may very well have once been separate from the rest of the manuscript, for it begins with a change of scribal hand, and the text on the last page ends imperfectly (fol 166v: Si quis metropolitanus episcopus nisi quod ad suam solummodo propriam pertinet parrochiam sine concilio). Fols 151–166 of P39 may therefore have originated as a stand-alone dossier of materials, and only been joined with the rest of the codex (i.e. the part of the codex with the Sancti Amandi excerpts) at a later time.

Editions
The Canones Basilienses has been edited once:
F.B. Asbach, ed., Das Poenitentiale Remense und der sogen. Excarpsus Cummeani: Überlieferung, Quellen und Entwicklung zweier kontinentaler Bußbücher aus der 1. Hälfte des 8. Jahrhunderts (Regensburg, 1975), Appendix, pp. 80–9.
 A new edition is currently in preparation by Michael D. Elliot.

The Canones Cottoniani has been edited once:
P.W. Finsterwalder, ed., Die Canones Theodori Cantuariensis und ihre Überlieferungsformen (Weimar, 1929), pp. 271–84, printing from L11. (Note: Wasserschleben had previously prepared an "implicit edition" of the Canones Cottoniani in his Die Bussordnungen der abendländischen Kirche, pp. 181–82, and before that B. Thorpe had collated parts of L11 against his edition of the Paenitentiale pseudo-Theodori in his Ancient laws and institutes of England, 2 vols [London, 1840], II, pp. 1–62.).
 A new edition is currently in preparation by Michael D. Elliot.

The Capitula Dacheriana has been edited three times and reprinted three times:
Luc d'Achery, ed., Veterum aliquot scriptorum ... spicilegium, 13 vols (Paris, 1655–1677), IX, pp. 52–62, printing from P36.
P. Labbè and G. Cossart, eds, Sacrosancta concilia, ad regiam editionem exacta quæ nunc quarta parte prodit auctior, 17 vols (Paris, 1671–1672), VI, Appendix, cols 1875–1878, reprinting d'Achery's edition.
Jacques Petit, ed., Theodori sanctissimi ac doctissimi archiepiscopi Cantuariensis Poenitentiale ..., 2 vols (Paris, 1677), pp. 86–7, reprinting selected canons from d'Achery's edition and collating these with readings from his own edition of the Half Form of the Paenitentiale Umbrense.
L.-F.-J. de la Barre, ed., Spicilegium sive collectio veterum aliquot scriptorum qui in Galliae bibliothecis delituerant ..., 3 vols (Paris, 1723), I, pp. 486–90, reprinting d'Achery's edition, with variant readings supplied from P22 (via a transcript prepared by Edmond Martène), and with the Canones Adomnani appended to the end.
F.W.H. Wasserschleben, ed., Die Bussordnungen der abendländischen Kirche (Halle, 1851), pp. 145–60, reprinting de-La-Barre's reprint of d'Achery's edition, but also using transcripts of P36 and P22 prepared by F.H. Knust.
P.W. Finsterwalder, ed., Die Canones Theodori Cantuariensis und ihre Überlieferungsformen (Weimar, 1929), pp. 239–52, printing from P22, with variant readings supplied from P36.
 A new edition (based principally on P36) is currently in preparation by Michael D. Elliot.

The Canones Gregorii has been edited five times and reprinted once:
F.W.H. Wasserschleben, Beitraege zur Geschichte der vorgratianischen Kirchenrechtsquellen (Leipzig, 1839), pp. 119–24, printing a selection of excerpts from Me1 that include chapters from the Canones Gregorii.
F. Kunstmann, ed., Die Lateinischen Pönitentialbücher der Angelsachsen, mit geschichtlicher Einleitung, (Mainz, 1844), pp. 129–41, printing from M14.
F.W.H. Wasserschleben, ed., Die Bussordnungen der abendländischen Kirche (Halle, 1851), pp. 160–80, reprinting Kunstmann's edition, and supplying variant readings from P12.
K. Hildenbrand, ed., Untersuchungen über die germanischen Pönitentialbücher (Würzburg, 1851), pp. 126–29, printing two short series of canons from M6 and M2, each of which includes excerpts from the Canones Gregorii.
H.J. Schmitz, ed., Die Bussbücher und das kanonische Bussverfahren, nach handschriftlichen Quellen dargestellt (Düsseldorf, 1898), pp. 523–42, printing from P12, and supplying variant readings from M14 as well as other penitential texts (including the Capitula Dacheriana and the Paenitentiale Umbrense)
P.W. Finsterwalder, ed., Die Canones Theodori Cantuariensis und ihre Überlieferungsformen (Weimar, 1929), pp. 253–70, printing from P27, with variant readings supplied from and M14 and P12, as well as from L1, M6, and Me1.
 A new edition (based principally on M14) is currently in preparation by Michael D. Elliot.

The Full Form of the Paenitentiale Umbrense has been edited eight times and reprinted once:
In twenty-nine chapter form:
 J.W. Bickel, Review of Wasserschleben’s Beitraege, in Kritische Jahrbücher für deutsche Rechtswissenschaft 5 (1839), pp. 390–403, at pp. 399–400, printing the prologue, register (twenty-eight-chapter form) and epilogue from W9 and Wz2.
 K. Hildenbrand, ed., Untersuchungen über die germanischen Pönitentialbücher (Würzburg, 1851), pp. 86–125, printing from W9 and supplying variants from Wz2, M17 as well as other penitential texts (including the Capitula Dacheriana [P36], Canones Gregorii [M6, M2, M14, Me1, the latter two as reported by Kunstmann and Wasserschleben], and both the Canones Cottoniani [L11] and Paenitentiale Umbrense [Cb4] as reported in the limited collation notes to the edition of the Paenitentiale pseudo-Theodori by B. Thorpe, Ancient laws and institutes of England, 2 vols [London, 1840], II, pp. 1–62). (Note: Hildenbrand's edition numbers only twenty-eight chapters, because his main witness for the Full Form [W9] is divided into twenty-eight chapters. Note too: Hildenbrand prints only the first part of the prologue, because his single witness to this part of the Full Form [Wz2] is incomplete.)
 A new edition (based principally on W7) is currently in preparation by Michael D. Elliot.
In two-book form:
F.W.H. Wasserschleben, ed., Die Bussordnungen der abendländischen Kirche (Halle, 1851), pp. 182–219, printing mainly from W9 (but with the prologue printed from W7) and supplying variants from W7, Wz2, and Paris, Bibliothèque nationale, Lat. 13452 (an early-modern apograph of Cb4), as well as several witnesses of the Half Form.
H.J. Schmitz, ed., Die Bussbücher und die Bussdisciplin der Kirche, nach handschriftlichen Quellen dargestellt (Mainz, 1883), pp. 524–50, claiming to print from W7, but actually reprinting Wasserschleben's edition.
A.W. Haddan and W. Stubbs, eds, Councils and ecclesiastical documents relating to Great Britain and Ireland, 3 vols (vol. II in 2 parts) (Oxford, 1869–1873), III, pp. 173–204, printing from Cb4, with variant readings supplied from Wasserschleben's edition. (Note: Cb4 was previously collated [as "N"] by B. Thorpe against his edition of the Paenitentiale pseudo-Theodori in his Ancient laws and institutes of England, 2 vols [London, 1840], II, pp. 1–62.)
H.J. Schmitz, ed., Die Bussbücher und das kanonische Bussverfahren, nach handschriftlichen Quellen dargestellt (Düsseldorf, 1898), pp. 544–56, printing cc. 1–16.3 only from W7, and supplying variant readings from W9, Wz2, and Paris, Bibliothèque nationale, Lat. 13452 (an early-modern apograph of Cb4).
P.W. Finsterwalder, ed., Die Canones Theodori Cantuariensis und ihre Überlieferungsformen (Weimar, 1929), pp. 285–334, printing his recension based on most of the extant witnesses.
Just the epilogue
A Mai, ed., Nova patrum bibliotheca, vol. VII, (Rome, 1854), part 3, p. 76, printing the fragmentary text of V6.

The Half Form of the Paenitentiale Umbrense (= cc. 16.4–25.4 + cc. 26(27)–29 + c. 13) has been edited twice and reprinted twice:
Jacques Petit, ed., Theodori sanctissimi ac doctissimi archiepiscopi Cantuariensis Poenitentiale ..., 2 vols (Paris, 1677), pp. 1–14, printing from P25 and P7. (Note: Petit also produced a partial recension of the Half Form [pp. 88–94] by collating his edition against readings found in other authorities [Burchard, Gratian, etc.].)
Nicolas J. Poisson, Delectus actorum ecclesiae universalis, seu nova summa conciliorum, epistolarum, decretorum SS. pontificum, capitularium, etc. ..., 2 vols (Lyon, 1706) II, cols 2274–2279, reprinting Petit's editions.
J.-P. Migne, ed., Patrologiæ cursus completus sive bibliotheca universalis ... omnium SS. patrum, doctorum scriptorumque ecclesiasticorum qui ab ævo apostoloca ad usque Innocentii III tempora floruerunt ... series secunda (= Latina) ..., 217 vols (Paris, 1844–1864), XCIX, cols 927A–936C, reprinting Petit's edition.
H.J. Schmitz, ed., Die Bussbücher und das kanonische Bussverfahren, nach handschriftlichen Quellen dargestellt (Düsseldorf, 1898), pp. 566–80, printing from B5, and supplying variant readings from several other Half Form witnesses, as well as W7 and M17.

Notes

Bibliography
F.B. Asbach, ed., Das Poenitentiale Remense und der sogen. Excarpsus Cummeani: Überlieferung, Quellen und Entwicklung zweier kontinentaler Bußbücher aus der 1. Hälfte des 8. Jahrhunderts (Regensburg, 1975). 
T.M. Charles-Edwards, "The penitential of Theodore and the Iudicia Theodori", in Archbishop Theodore: commemorative studies on his life and influence, ed. M. Lapidge, Cambridge studies in Anglo-Saxon England 11 (Cambridge, 1995), 141–74.
P.W. Finsterwalder, ed., Die Canones Theodori Cantuariensis und ihre Überlieferungsformen (Weimar, 1929).
R. Flechner, "An insular tradition of ecclesiastical law: fifth to eighth century", in Anglo-Saxon/Irish relations before the Vikings, eds J. Graham-Campbell and M. Ryan, Proceedings of the British Academy 157 (Oxford, 2009), 23–46.
R. Flechner, "The making of the Canons of Theodore", in Peritia 17–18 (2003–2004), pp. 121–43.
A.J. Frantzen, The literature of penance in Anglo-Saxon England (New Brunswick, N.J., 1983), pp. 62–69, et passim.
A.W. Haddan and W. Stubbs, eds, Councils and ecclesiastical documents relating to Great Britain and Ireland, 3 vols (vol. II in 2 parts) (Oxford, 1869–1873), III, pp. 173–213..
R. Haggenmüller, Die Überlieferung der Beda und Egbert zugeschriebenen Bussbücher, Europäische Hochschulschriften, Reihe 3: Geschichte und ihre Hilfswissenschaften 461 (Frankfurt am Main, 1991).
L. Körntgen, Studien zu den Quellen der frühmittelalterlichen Bußbücher, Quellen und Forschungen zum Recht im Mittelalter 7 (Sigmaringen, 1993).
R. Kottje, "Paenitentiale Theodori", in Handwörterbuch zur deutschen Rechtsgeschichte. III. Band: List–Protonotar, eds A. Erler and E. Kaufmann, with W. Stammler and R. Schmidt-Wiegand (Berlin, 1984), cols 1413–16.
J.T. McNeill and H.M. Gamer, Medieval handbooks of penance: a translation of the principal libri poenitentiales and selections from related documents (New York, 1938), pp. 58–60 and 179–215.
R. Meens, Het tripartite boeteboek. Overlevering en betekenis van vroegmiddeleeuwse biechtvoorschriften (met editie en vertaling van vier tripartita), Middeleeuwse studies en bronnen 41 (Hilversum, 1994), pp. 30–6.
H. Mordek, Bibliotheca capitularium regum Francorum manuscripta. Überlieferung und Traditionszusammenhang der fränkischen Herrschererlasse, MGH Hilfsmittel 15 (Munich, 1995).
H. Mordek, Kirchenrecht und Reform im Frankenreich: die Collectio vetus Gallica, die älteste systematische Kanonessammlung des fränkischen Gallien. Studien und Edition, Beiträge zur Geschichte und Quellenkunde des Mittelalters 1 (Berlin, 1975).
F.W.H. Wasserschleben, ed., Die Bussordnungen der abendländischen Kirche (Halle, 1851), pp. 13–37 and 145–219.

 Further reading 
 Elliot's synoptic edition of all five versions of the Iudicia TheodoriCanones Basilienses Elliot's edition (in progress) of the Canones Basilienses
 A diplomatic transcription of the copy of the Canones Basilienses in Basel, Universitätsbibliothek, N. I 1 no. 3cCanones Cottoniani Elliot's edition (in progress) of the Canones Cottoniani
 A diplomatic transcription of the copy of the Canones Cottoniani in Paris, Bibliothèque nationale, Lat. 12021, fols 33–356Capitula Dacheriana Elliot's edition (in progress) of the Capitula Dacheriana
 Wasserschleben's 1851 edition of the Capitula Dacheriana (Google Books)
 De la Barre's 1723 reprint of d'Achery's edition of the Capitula Dacheriana (Google Books)
 Labbè–Cossart's 1671 reprint of d'Achery's edition of the Capitula Dacheriana (Google Books)
 d'Achery's 1669 edition of the Capitula Dacheriana (Google Books)Canones Gregorii Elliot's edition (in progress) of the Canones Gregorii
 A diplomatic transcription of the copy of the Canones Gregorii in Munich, Bayerische Staatsbibliothek, Clm 14780, fols 1–53 (where it is combined with the Libellus responsionum)
 Schmitz's 1898 edition of the Canones Gregorii (Internet Archive)
 Wasserschleben's 1851 reprint of the Kunstmann's edition of the Canones Gregorii (Google Books)
 Kunstmann's 1844 edition of the Canones Gregorii (Google Books)Paenitentiale Umbrense Elliot's edition (in progress) of the Paenitentiale Umbrense in twenty-nine chapter form
 A diplomatic transcription of the copy of the Paenitentiale Umbrense (twenty-nine chapter form) in Vienna, Österreichische Nationalbibliothek, Lat. 2195, fols 2v–46 (where it is combined with the Libellus responsionum in a 49-chapter work)
 Hildenbrand's 1851 edition of the Paenitentiale Umbrense in twenty-nine chapter form (Google Books)
 Bickel's 1839 edition of the preface, register and epilogue of the Paenitentiale Umbrense (Google Books)
 McNeill–Gamer's 1938 English translation of the Paenitentiale Umbrense (Google Books, preview)
 Schmitz's 1898 partial edition (cc. 1–16.3) of the Paenitentiale Umbrense in two-book form (Internet Archive)
 Schmitz's 1883 reprint of Wasserchleben's edition of the Paenitentiale Umbrense in two-book form (Google Books)
 Haddan–Stubbs's 1873 edition of the Paenitentiale Umbrense in two-book form (Google Books)
 Mai's 1854 edition of the epilogue of the Paenitentiale Umbrense from V6 (Google Books)
 Wasserschleben's 1851 edition of the Paenitentiale Umbrense in two-book form (Google Books)Paenitentiale Umbrense''''' (Half Form)
 Schmitz's 1898 edition of the Half Form of the Paenitentiale Umbrense (Google Books)
 Petit's 1677 edition of the Half Form of the Paenitentiale Umbrense (Google Books)

Sacramental law
8th-century Latin books